Jan Mühlstein (born 3 July 1949 in Most, Czechoslovakia) is a journalist, German Jewish activist and the former chair of the Union of Progressive Jews in Germany.

Life 
Jan Mühlstein grew up in a German-speaking Jewish family, which traditionally practised Liberal Judaism. In 1967, he began studying physics at the Karl University in Prague. After the defeat of the reformation movement known as the Prague Spring, in which Mühlstein participated actively, he emigrated to West Germany in 1969. From 1970 onwards, he studied physics at the Ludwig Maximilians University in Munich and completed a Ph.D. in theoretical quantum optics in 1977. During the next four years, he worked in the leadership of project energy research of the nuclear energy research facility in Jülich. Since 1982 Mühlstein has been working as a business journalist in Munich and is deputy chief editor of a journal covering the economics of the energy market.

Between 1977 and 1978 Mühlstein was a board member of the West German section of Amnesty International. He is a co-founder of  the Liberal Jewish Community Munich "Beth Shalom", whose chair he was until 2005. He was again elected as chair of Beth Shalom in May 2011. From 1999 until 2011, he was the chair of the Union of Progressive Jews in Germany. Mühlstein is particularly committed to promote religious plurality in Judaism.

Mühlstein is married to Dr. Verena Mühlstein (*1953), author of a biography about Albert Schweitzer's wife, Helene Bresslau, who is also active at Beth Shalom. One of his three daughters works as a rabbi at the West London Synagogue of British Jews.

External links 
 Publications of Jan Mühlstein in  Greenpilot-Database of the Deutsche Zentralbibliothek für Medizin 
 Report about congregation Beth Shalom

References

1949 births
German Reform Jews
Living people
Jewish German politicians
Recipients of the Cross of the Order of Merit of the Federal Republic of Germany